This article describes all the 2015 seasons of Formula Renault series across the world.

Calendar
This table indicates the round number of each Formula Renault series according to weekend dates.

Formula Renault 3.5L

Formula Renault 2.0L

2015 Eurocup Formula Renault 2.0 season

2015 Formula Renault 2.0 Northern European Cup season

2015 Formula Renault 2.0 Alps season

2015 Asian Formula Renault Series season

Formula Renault 1.6L

2015 French F4 Championship season

2015 Formula Renault 1.6 Nordic season

2015 Formula Renault 1.6 NEZ season

Other Formulas powered by Renault championships

2015 V de V Challenge Monoplace

2015 Remus Formula Renault 2.0 Cup season
The season was held between 13 May and 11 September and raced across Austria, Germany, Italy and Czech Republic. The races occur with other categories as part of the Austria Formula 3 Cup, this section presents only the Austrian Formula Renault 2.0 classifications.

2015 Formula Renault 2.0 Argentina season
All cars use Tito 02 chassis, all races were held in Argentina.

1 extra point in each race for regularly qualified drivers.

References

External links
 Renault Sport official website

Renault
Formula Renault seasons